Foulk Stapleford is a former civil parish, now in the parish of Hargrave and Huxley, in the unitary authority of Cheshire West and Chester and the ceremonial county of Cheshire, England. The population of the civil parish as taken at the 2011 census was 161. The civil parish was abolished in 2015 to form Hargrave and Huxley.

It contained the village of Hargrave. St Peter's Church, Hargrave is a Grade II* listed building.

See also

Listed buildings in Foulk Stapleford

References

Former civil parishes in Cheshire
Cheshire West and Chester